Elliott Shriane (born 27 April 1987) is an Olympic short track speed skater from Brisbane, Australia.

2006 Winter Olympics
Shriane represented Australia in the 2006 Winter Olympic Games in Turin, Italy, competing in the men's 5000m relay event. The relay team achieved fourth in the semi-final, and first in the B final in a time of 7:01.666 for a final placing of sixth for the competition.

2005 World Cup
He was a skater in the World Cup relay team which placed fifth in the Bormio World Cup in November 2005, qualifying Australia for the event in the 2006 Winter Olympic Games and setting the Australian national record in the process.

Individual competition
Competing as an individual, Elliott has competed on the international circuit for four years, specialising in the 500m event. He placed 27th in the 500m in the 2005/06 China World Cup, and 15th in the 2007/08 China World Cup. Other notable results include 2nd place in the 2005 Australian Open Championships, and 8th place in the 2000m relay event at the Junior World Championships in Belgrade, Serbia in 2005.

References

External links
 
 

1987 births
Living people
Australian male short track speed skaters
Olympic short track speed skaters of Australia
Short track speed skaters at the 2006 Winter Olympics
Sportspeople from Brisbane